Shklar (Shkliar, Shklyar) is Ukrainian and Belarusian surname meaning Glassmaker often given to Jews, may refer to:

Judith N. Shklar (1928–1992), American political scientist
Leon Shklar, software developer and an author on the subject of web development
Vasyl Shkliar Ukrainian writer and political activist.

See also
 Sklar